The 21st Central American Championships in Athletics were held at the Estadio Mateo Flores in Guatemala City, Guatemala, between September 17–18, 2010. 

A total of 40 events were contested, 20 by men and 20 by women.

Medal summary

Complete results and medal winners were published.

Men

Note
†: Event with no points for the team trophy contest because of the low number of participants.

Women

Note
†: Event with no points for the team trophy contest because of the low number of participants.

Medal table (unofficial)

Note
†: The unofficial medal count is almost in agreement with the published one.  The difference of 10 bronze medals for Costa Rica (7 in the unofficial count compared to 17 published) is most probably a typo.

Team trophies
Guatemala won the overall team trophy.

Total

References

 
International athletics competitions hosted by Guatemala
Central American Championships in Athletics
Central American Championships in Athletics
Central American Championships in Athletics
Sport in Guatemala City